The Warsaw University of Life Sciences (SGGW) is the largest agricultural university in Poland, established in 1816 in Warsaw. It employs over 2,600 staff including over 1,200 academic educators. The University is since 2005 a member of the Euroleague for Life Sciences (ELLS) which was established in 2001. The SGGW offers some 37 different fields of study, 13 faculties in Agricultural Sciences, Economic Sciences, Humanities, Technical as well as Life Sciences

History
On 23 September 1816 the School of Agronomy was founded at Marymont and was accommodated in the palace of Marie Casimire Louise de La Grange d'Arquien. Branches were established at Bielany, Ruda, Wawrzyszew and Buraków. An Institute of Veterinary Medicine was established at Rządowa, followed by the Institute of Rural Economy and Forestry in 1840. As Poland was ruled by the Tsar of Russia there were attempts at Russification which nearly resulted in the closure of the school, but it was transferred first to Puławy and later to Russia. After the independence of Poland in 1918 the Institute was returned to Warsaw and became the Major School of Rural Economy in 1919. Horticultural studies were added to those of agriculture and forestry in 1921. Activity was disrupted by the Second World War and resumed in 1945. The veterinary faculty was transferred from the University of Warsaw in 1952, and later the departments of agricultural drainage, wood technology, animal husbandry, and of landscape, now known as the Landscape Architecture Section, were established. In 1973 the faculties of agricultural technology and human nutrition were established. The Rector of the university has an office in the historic palace of Julian Ursyn Niemcewicz, now known as "the rector's palace."

Campus

The campus is located is the southernmost district of Warsaw, Ursynów. The campus has a historic part, with an 18th century palace, and a contemporary part where most of the faculty buildings and dormitories are situated. On 70-hectare main campus are located 12 dormitories, a modern library, a sports centre (with tennis courts, a sports hall and a swimming pool) a language centre, a veterinary clinic.

Faculties

 Agriculture and Ecology
 Animal Breeding, Bioengineering and Conservation 
 Applied Informatics and Mathematics
 Biology and Biotechnology
 Civil and Environmental Engineering 
 Economics
 Food Technology
 Forestry 
 Horticulture
 Human Nutrition
 Sociology and Education
 Production Engineering 
 Wood Technology 
 Veterinary Medicine

Notable staff

 Józef Mikułowski-Pomorski (1868–1935), politician, agricultural chemist; Minister of Religious and Public Enlightenment 1922–1923, 1926

 Władysław Grabski (1874–1938), politician, economist and historian; Prime Minister of Poland 1923–1925; founder of the Bank of Poland and the Polish currency
 Stefan Ignar (1908–1992), politician, economist, Deputy Prime Minister of the Republic of Poland 1956–1969

Rectors

 Józef Mikułowski-Pomorski (1918–1920)
 Tadeusz Miłobędzki (1920–1921)
 Stefan Biedrzycki (1921–1922)
 Wacław Dąbrowski (1922–1923)
 Jan Sosnowski (1923–1925)
 Zdzisław Ludkiewicz (1925–1926)
 Władysław Grabski (1926–1928)
 Józef Mikułowski-Pomorski (1928–1929)
 Stefan Biedrzycki (1929–1932)
 Jan Sosnowski (1932–1933)
 Marian Górski (1933–1936)
 Jan Miklaszewski (1936–1944)
 Franciszek Staff (1944–1947)
 Marian Górski (1947–1949)
 Antoni Kleszczycki (1949–1955)
 Kazimierz Krysiak (1955–1962)
 Antoni Kleszczycki (1962–1969)
 Zbigniew Muszyński (1969–1975)
 Henryk Jasiorowski (1975–1981)
 Maria Joanna Radomska (1981–1987)
 Wiesław Barej (1987–1990)
 Jan Górecki (1990–1996)
 Włodzimierz Kluciński (1996–2002)
 Tomasz Borecki (2002–2008)
 Alojzy Szymański (2008–2016)
 Wiesław Bielawski (2016–2020)
 Michał Zasada (since 2020)

Notes

See also
 List of forestry universities and colleges

 
Agricultural universities and colleges in Poland
Educational institutions established in 1816
1816 establishments in Europe